Nils Henning Hontvedt (born 27 August 1952) is a Norwegian politician for the Labour Party.

In 1997, during the cabinet Jagland, he was appointed political advisor in the Ministry of Justice and the Police.

He was mayor of Horten between 2001 and 2011.

References

1952 births
Living people
Labour Party (Norway) politicians
Mayors of places in Vestfold
People from Horten